Ruairi McGoff (born 5 January 1985) is a professional rugby league footballer who has played in the 2010s.

Playing career
McGoff played for the Barrow Raiders before joining Workington Town on loan in 2010.  He moved permanently to Workington Town in 2011 but re-signed for Barrow for the 2012 season. He made his international début for Canada against South Africa in 2011.  In 2019 Gary Charlton signed him for Whitehaven and he was part of the team that won the 2019 League 1 title.

References

1985 births
Living people
Barrow Raiders players
Canada national rugby league team players
English people of Canadian descent
English rugby league players
Rugby league hookers
Rugby league players from Cumbria
Rugby league props
Rugby league wingers
Whitehaven R.L.F.C. players
Workington Town players
Canadian expatriate sportspeople in England